Peeter Allik (June 28, 1966 in Põltsamaa – December 31, 2019 in Tartu) was an Estonian artist and Surrealist (black and white dactyloscopic tendency).

He graduated from University of Tartu.

In 1997, he became the first laureate of Ado Vabbe Prize.

In 2002, he also won the Grand Prix on VIII International Biennale of the Baltic states in Kaliningrad.

References

External links 

 Peeter Allik web page
 Peeter Allik in St-Petersburg (Russia)

1966 births
2019 deaths
20th-century Estonian male artists
21st-century Estonian male artists
20th-century Estonian painters
21st-century Estonian painters
University of Tartu alumni
People from Põltsamaa
Estonian printmakers